Yalnızcabağ (literally "Lonely orchard") is a village in Mut district of Mersin Province, Turkey. It is one of the  westernmost villages of the province ar  in Toros Mountains. Population  of Yalnızcabağ was 644. as of 2012. Main crops of the village are pomegranate, apple, grape and pistachio  The tomb of Nure Sofi, the predecessor of Karamanoğlu dynasty is the pasture of in Yalnızcabağ. He died in the 13th century. Three centuries later, in 1687 the borders of his personal territory was certified by the Ottoman authorities. A copy of the certificate is kept by the muhtar of the village.

References

Villages in Mut District